The L.A. Rebellion film movement, sometimes referred to as the "Los Angeles School of Black Filmmakers", or the UCLA Rebellion, refers to the new generation of young African and African-American filmmakers who studied at the UCLA Film School in the late-1960s to the late-1980s and have created a black cinema that provides an alternative to classical Hollywood cinema.

Background
In June 1953, Ike Jones became the first African American to graduate from the UCLA Film School. In the next 15 years, the numbers of African-American filmmakers remained small.  One of those was Vantile Whitfield, who founded the Performing Arts Society of Los Angeles in 1964 and received a master's degree at UCLA in 1967. By the late 1960s, in the midst of affirmative action, the number of black students steadily increased. Among this new crop of artists were Charles Burnett, an engineering student who had attended Los Angeles City College, and Haile Gerima, an Ethiopian filmmaker who had recently moved from Chicago. Unlike their predecessors, they eschewed Hollywood conventions and were influenced by films from Latin America, Italian neorealism, European art films, and the emerging cinema of Africa.  They were among the first of what became known as the "Los Angeles School of Black Filmmakers."

In the wake of the Watts Riots and other forms of social unrest, such as a 1969 shoot-out on the UCLA campus involving Ron Karenga's US Organization, Burnett and several other students of color helped push the university to start an ethnographic studies program. Elyseo J. Taylor, who was the only Black instructor at the UCLA Film School in the early 1970s, was an influential instructor in that program.

UCLA Us Organization shoot out was actually not a "shoot out" since there was no gun fire exchange. Two armed Us Organization members ambushed and killed two unarmed leading Black Panther Party members; Alprentice "Bunchy" Carter and John Huggins. This scenario is well documented in Ward Churchill's Agents of Repression (1988).

Teshome Gabriel, a film scholar and historian, began teaching at UCLA in 1974 and became both a colleague and mentor to many filmmakers associated with the movement.

Identification of movement
Film scholar Clyde Taylor coined the term "L.A. Rebellion" to describe the filmmakers.

In the spring of 1997, Doc Films, a student-run film society based at the University of Chicago, hosted one of the first retrospectives of L.A. Rebellion films. Jacqueline Stewart, an associate professor at the university, helped coordinate the program.  This series included works by Charles Burnett, Haile Gerima and Julie Dash.

In Fall 2011, UCLA Film and Television Archive programmed a major retrospective of these films entitled, "L.A. Rebellion: Creating a New Black Cinema." The series was funded by the Getty Foundation as a part of Pacific Standard Time: Art in L.A. 1945-1980. Preceding the program, the UCLA curatorial team conducted oral histories, identifying nearly fifty filmmakers, many of whom had remained invisible for decades. Papers and films by the filmmakers were collected and numerous films were preserved before screening. A catalog was also published, "L.A. Rebellion: Creating a New Black Cinema (Los Angeles, 2011), which accompanied the touring program through more than fifteen cities in North America and Europe.

List of important figures of the L.A. Rebellion movement

Filmmakers
Many of the filmmakers listed below, while primarily known as writer/directors, worked in multiple capacities on various film productions through their early careers.

 Gay Abel-Bey
 Anita W. Addison
 Shirikiana Aina 
 Don Amis
 Melvonna Ballenger 
 S. Torriano Berry
 Carroll Parrott Blue
 Storme' Bright (Sweet)
 Charles Burnett
 Ben Caldwell
 Larry Clark
 Julie Dash
 Zeinabu irene Davis
 Pierre Desir
 Alicia Dhanifu 
 Omah Diegu (Ijeoma Iloputaife) 

 Jamaa Fanaka
 Jacqueline Frazier
 Haile Gerima
 Alile Sharon Larkin
 Barbara McCullough
 Bernard Nicolas
 O.Funmilayo Makarah
 Thomas Penick
 Imelda Sheen (Mildred Richard)
 Monona Wali
 Grayling Williams
 Robert Wheaton
 Iverson White
 Billy Woodberry

Actors
The following actors appeared in various L.A. Rebellion films and are to some degree associated with the movement:

 Adisa Anderson
 Haskell V. Anderson III
 Barbara-O
 Charles David Brooks III
 Angela Burnett

 Nate Hardman
 Kaycee Moore
 Sy Richardson
 Henry G. Sanders

Others
The following have supported the work of L.A. Rebellion filmmakers as mentors and/or scholars:

 Clyde Taylor, film critic, coined the phrase "L.A. Rebellion" to describe this movement
 Elyseo J. Taylor, filmmaker and instructor at UCLA
 Vantile Whitfield, an early African-American UCLA Film School graduate and founder of the Performing Arts Society of Los Angeles (PASLA)
 Teshome Gabriel, film scholar and Professor at UCLA
 Ntongela Masilela, film scholar
 Jacqueline Najuma Stewart, film scholar and Associate Professor at Northwestern University
 Allyson Nadia Field, Associate Professor of Cinema and Media Studies and African American Studies at UCLA
 Jan-Christopher Horak, Director of the UCLA Film & Television Archive

List of notable L.A. Rebellion films
The following is a chronological list of short and feature-length films from the L.A. Rebellion filmmakers that are generally considered to be seminal or notable.

 Several Friends (1969)
 Single Parent Family: Images in Black (1976)
 Emma Mae (1976)
 Harvest: 3,000 Years (1976)
 Passing Through (1977)
 Killer of Sheep (1978)
 Bush Mama (1979)
 Penitentiary (1979)
 Water Ritual #1: An Urban Rite of Purification (1979)
Your Children Come Back to You (1979)
Ashes and Embers (1982)
 A Different Image (1982)
 Illusions (1982)
 Bless Their Little Hearts (1984)
Cycles (1989)
To Sleep with Anger (1990)
 Daughters of the Dust (1991)
 Sankofa (1993)
 The Glass Shield (1994)
 Adwa  (1999) 
 Compensation (2000)

Influence and legacy

A documentary, Spirits of Rebellion: Black Cinema at UCLA, features interviews with many filmmakers associated with the movement. Directed by Zeinabu irene Davis, it was screened as a work-in-progress on Saturday, October 8, 2011 as part of "L.A. Rebellion: Creating a New Black Cinema."

L.A. Rebellion films that have been voted onto the National Film Registry: Killer of Sheep (1990), Daughters of the Dust (2004), Bless Their Little Hearts (2013) and To Sleep with Anger (2017).

See also
 African cinema
 Blaxploitation
 Cuban cinema
 Cult classic
 European art cinema
 French New Wave
 Italian neorealism
 Latin American cinema
 New Hollywood

References

External links
 Trailer of Spirits of Rebellion on YouTube
 L.A. Rebellion: Creating a New Black Cinema
 Spirits of Rebellion official website

Further reading
 Field, Allyson Nadia; Horak, Jan-Christopher; Stewart, Jacqueline Najuma, eds. (2015). L.A. Rebellion: Creating a New Black Cinema. Oakland, California: University of California Press.

 
1970s in film
1980s in film
1990s in film
American cinema by ethnicity
Film
African-American cinema
African-American film directors
American film directors
Movements in cinema
1970s in American cinema
1980s in American cinema
1990s in American cinema